Brentwood Middle/High School is a small, suburban school located in Brentwood, Pennsylvania, outside of Pittsburgh. It is part of the Brentwood Borough School District. The school currently teaches grades 6-12.

History
The high school first started in 1925 in the basement of the existing Elroy Elementary School and only taught the ninth grade. In 1932, a new high school was built alongside the current Brentwood Park. However, this was only one building. The building received its first addition in 1939 to accommodate the rapid increase in population. In 1959, another addition was completed, which offered more rooms and the schools first gymnasium. In 1971, a new four-story building was constructed that included a swimming pool and more classrooms. 

The building had its latest renovation in 1999 in which a new academic wing was constructed. While the new wing was being built, the classrooms in the 1971 building were demolished and replaced with the second gymnasium, alongside more extracurricular rooms. This is now where grades 9-12 are taught, with grades 6-8 being taught in the 1932-59 buildings.

Extracurriculars
The district offers a wide variety of clubs, band, musical, other activities and sports.

Sports programs
 Girls Volleyball
 Boys Basketball
 Girls Basketball
 Football
 Girls Softball
 Baseball
 Boys Soccer
 Cross Country
 Swimming
 Track and Field
 Golf

Notable alumni

Referenced on individual Wikipedia page links.
Robert W. Bazley, former General in USAF - Class of 1943
Joe Schmidt, former NFL player and head coach for Detroit Lions, member of Pro Football Hall of Fame - Class of circa 1949
Bob Cranmer, former Chairman of Allegheny County Board of County Commissioners - Class of 1974
Scott Radecic, former Academic All American football linebacker who played 12 seasons in National Football League - Class of 1980
Michael J. Fisher, retired Chief, US Border Patrol, - Class of 1982

References

Schools in Allegheny County, Pennsylvania
Public high schools in Pennsylvania